Scutellarein is a flavone that can be found in Scutellaria lateriflora and other members of the genus Scutellaria, as well as the fern Asplenium belangeri.

Glycosides 
The scutellarin (Scutellarein-7-glucuronide) is transformed by hydrolysis into scutellarein.

References 

Flavones
Pyrogallols